Oświęcim is a city in the Lesser Poland province of southern Poland, situated  southeast of Katowice, near the confluence of the Vistula (Wisła) and Soła rivers. The city is known internationally for being the site of the Auschwitz concentration camp (the camp is also known as KL or KZ Auschwitz Birkenau) during World War II, when Poland was occupied by Nazi Germany.

Name

The name of the city is of Slavic extraction, possibly derived from the owner of a Slavic gord which existed there in the Middle Ages. It has been spelled many different ways and known by many different languages over time, including Polish, Czech, German, and Latin.

The town was an important center of commerce from the late Middle Ages onward. Fourteenth-century German-speaking merchants called it Auswintz; by the 15th century, this name had become Auschwitz. From 1772 to 1918 Oświęcim belonged to the Habsburg the Kingdom of Galicia and Lodomeria (from 1804 a crownland of the Austrian Empire and 1867 Austria-Hungary), and both Polish and German names were in official use. The town was annexed into Nazi Germany during World War II and the name Auschwitz was used. It became known as Oświęcim after 27 January 1945, when the Wehrmacht was pushed out by the Red Army.

Geography and transport
Oświęcim lies at the intersection of National Road 44 and local roads 933 and 948. Oświęcim's old town is east of the Soła, with the Main Market Square (Rynek Główny) at its center. The railway station is across the river in the northwest part of town; the main museum is on the west side. The Auschwitz-Birkenau State Museum is in the village of Brzezinka, to the west of the railway station. The chemical works are east of the town.

The main bus station of the town lies in the east of the town, and local bus services are operated by PKS Oświęcim. The PKP railway services are available to Kraków, Katowice and Czechowice-Dziedzice, and internationally to Vienna and Prague. According to the 2002 data, Oświęcim is 30 km2, of which forests comprise only 1%. The neighbouring boroughs (gmina) are Chelmek, Libiąż, and the gmina of Oświęcim.

Climate 
Oświęcim has a warm humid continental climate characterized by four distinct seasons: spring, summer, autumn, and winter. Precipitation is fairly evenly distributed throughout the year, though the spring and summer seasons tend to receive more precipitation. Summers are pleasantly warm and humid while winters are bitterly cold and windy. Fog is fairly common throughout the year.

History

Oświęcim has a rich history, which dates back to the early days of Polish statehood. It is one of the oldest castellan gords in Poland. Following the Fragmentation of Poland in 1138, Duke Casimir II the Just attached the town to the Duchy of Opole in c. 1179 for his younger brother Mieszko I Tanglefoot, Duke of Opole and Racibórz. The town was destroyed in 1241 during the Mongol invasion of Poland. Around 1272 the newly rebuilt Oświęcim was granted a municipal charter modeled on those of Lwówek Śląski (a Polish variation of the Magdeburg Law). The charter was confirmed on 3 September 1291. In 1281, the Land of Oświęcim became part of the newly established Duchy of Cieszyn, and in c. 1315, an independent Duchy of Oświęcim was established. In 1327, John I, Duke of Oświęcim joined his Duchy with the Duchy of Zator and, soon afterwards, his state became a vassal of the Kingdom of Bohemia, where it remained for over a century. In 1445, the Duchy was divided into three separate entities – the Duchies of Oświęcim, Zator and Toszek. In 1457 Polish King Casimir IV Jagiellon bought the rights to Oświęcim. On 25 February 1564, King Sigismund II Augustus issued a bill integrating the former Duchies of Oświęcim and Zator into the Kingdom of Poland. Both lands were attached to the Kraków Voivodeship, forming the Silesian County. The town later became one of the centers of Protestant culture in Poland.

Like other towns of Lesser Poland, Oświęcim prospered in the period known as Polish Golden Age. Good times ended in 1655, during the catastrophic Swedish invasion of Poland. Oświęcim was burned and afterward, the town declined, and in 1772 (see Partitions of Poland), it was annexed by the Habsburg Empire, as part of the Kingdom of Galicia and Lodomeria, where it remained until late 1918. After the 1815 Congress of Vienna, the town was close to the borders of both Russian-controlled Congress Poland, and the Kingdom of Prussia. In the 1866 war between Austria and the Prussian-led North German Confederation, a cavalry skirmish was fought at the town, in which an Austrian force defeated a Prussian incursion.

In the second half of the 19th century, Oświęcim became an important rail junction. During the same period, the town burned in several fires, such as the fire of 23 August 1863, when two-thirds of Oświęcim burned, including the town hall and two synagogues; a new town hall was built between 1872 and 1875. In another fire in 1881, the parish church, a school, and a hospital burned down. In 1910, Oświęcim became the seat of a starosta, and in 1917–18 a new district, Nowe Miasto, was founded. In 1915, a high school was opened. After World War I, the town became part of the Second Polish Republic's Kraków Voivodeship (Województwo Krakowskie). Until 1932, Oświęcim was the seat of a county, but on 1 April 1932, the County of Oświęcim was divided between the County of Wadowice, and the County of Biala Krakowska.

World War II

There were approximately 8,000 Jews in the city on the eve of World War II, comprising more than half the population.
The Nazis annexed the area to Germany in October 1939 in the Gau of Upper Silesia, which became part of the "second Ruhr" by 1944.

In 1940, Nazi Germany used forced labor to build a new subdivision to house Auschwitz guards and staff, and they decided to build a large chemical plant of IG Farben in 1941 on the eastern outskirts of the town. Polish residents of several districts were forced to abandon their houses, as the Germans wanted to keep the area empty around Auschwitz concentration camp. They planned a  buffer zone around the camp, and they expelled Polish residents in two stages in 1940 and 1941. All the residents of the Zasole district were forced to abandon their homes. In the Plawy and Harmeze districts, more than 90-percent of the buildings were destroyed and the residents of Plawy were transported to Gorlice to fend for themselves. Altogether, some 17,000 people in Oświęcim itself and surrounding villages were forced to leave their homes, eight villages were wiped off the map, and the population of Oświęcim shrank to 7,600 by April 1941.

The Red Army liberated the town and the camp on 27 January 1945, and they opened two temporary camps for German POWs in the complex of Auschwitz-Birkenau. The Auschwitz Soviet camp existed until autumn 1945, and the Birkenau camp lasted until spring 1946. Some 15,000 Germans were interned there. Furthermore, there was a camp of Communist secret police (Urząd Bezpieczeństwa) near the rail station in the complex of former "Gemeinschaftslager". Its prisoners were members of the NSDAP, Hitlerjugend, and BDM, as well as German civilians, the Volksdeutsche, and Upper Silesians who were suspected of being disloyal to Poland.

After World War II
After the territorial changes of Poland immediately after World War II, new housing complexes in the town were developed with large buildings of rectangular and concrete constructions. The chemical industry became the main employer of the town and in later years, the service industry and trade were added. Tourism to the concentration campsites is an important source of revenue for the town's businesses. In the mid-1990s, following Communism's end, employment at the chemical works (former I.G. Farben, renamed Dwory S.A.) reduced from 10,000 in the Communist era to only 1,500 people. In 1952, the County of Oświęcim was re-created, and the town until 1975 belonged to Kraków Voivodeship. In 1975–1999, it was part of Bielsko-Biała Voivodeship. In 1979, Oświęcim was visited by Pope John Paul II, and on 1 September 1980, a local Solidarity office was created at the chemical plant. On 28 May 2006, the town was visited by Pope Benedict XVI.

Local sports
The ice hockey team of TH Unia Oświęcim was crowned Polish champions 8 times, and finished as runners-up in 2022. Sports club Unia Oświęcim was established in 1946, and apart from ice-hockey, it has such departments, as swimming, figure skating, and association football (as Zasole-Unia Oświęcim). In the past, Unia had boxing, table tennis, volleyball, track and field, cycling, and basketball departments. Another sports organization from Oświęcim is Sports Club Sola (established 1919).

Notable people

Polish figure skaters Sabina Wojtala, Dorota Siudek and Mariusz Siudek are from the town. Other notable people from the town include Piotr Gruszka (volleyball player and World Champion), Paweł Korzeniowski (swimmer), Rabbi Aaron Miller (father of chazzan Benzion Miller), Marian Kasperczyk (Polish-born French painter), Beata Szydło (16th Prime Minister of Poland), Victor Zarnowitz (American economist), Arkadiusz Skrzypaszek (modern pentathlete and double Olympic gold medallist) and Shimson Kleuger, known as "The Last Jew in Auschwitz".

Members of Parliament (Sejm) elected from this constituency include Beata Szydło (PiS), Jarosław Szlachetka (PiS), Ewa Filipiak (PiS), Zbigniew Biernat (PiS), Marek Polak (PiS), Marek Sowa (PO), Dorota Niedziela (PO), Józef Brynkus (K'15)

International relations

Twin towns and sister cities
Oświęcim is twinned with:

See also

 Auschwitz Jewish Center in Oświęcim
Oświęcim Jewish cemetery
 Tourism in Poland
 Mural trail in Oświęcim

References

Notes

Sources

External links

 
 Oświęcim at Virtual Shtetl
 The Oshpitzin Yizkor Database (1919–1941) at JewishGen
 All About Auschwitz at Our Poland
 James Glenday, "What's It Like to Live next to the World's Most Notorious Concentration Camp", Australian Broadcasting Corporation News, 24 February 2018   http://www.abc.net.au/news/2018-02-24/life-next-to-the-worlds-most-notorious-concentration-camp/9480916

 
Oświęcim County
Cities and towns in Lesser Poland Voivodeship
Lesser Poland
Kraków Voivodeship (14th century – 1795)
Kingdom of Galicia and Lodomeria
Kraków Voivodeship (1919–1939)
 Holocaust locations in Poland